Mgimwa is a surname. Notable people with the surname include:

 Godfrey Mgimwa (born 1981), Tanzanian politician
 Mahmoud Mgimwa (born 1963), Tanzanian politician
 William Mgimwa (1950–2014), Tanzanian politician

Surnames of African origin